The Clan Club (El club del clan) is a 1964 Argentine film directed by Enrique Carreras.

Cast
Cachita Galán
Palito Ortega
Violeta Rivas
Johny Tedesco
Jolly Land

External links
 

1964 films
1960s Spanish-language films
Argentine black-and-white films
1960s Argentine films
Films directed by Enrique Carreras